The following is a list of notable deaths in July 2011.

Entries for each day are listed alphabetically by surname. A typical entry lists information in the following sequence:
 Name, age, country of citizenship at birth, subsequent country of citizenship (if applicable), reason for notability, cause of death (if known), and reference.

July 2011

1
Jane Baker, 88, American community organizer and politician, first female Mayor of San Mateo, California.
Leslie Brooks, 89, American actress.
Edmund Snow Carpenter, 88, American anthropologist.
Charlie Craig, 73, American songwriter ("She's Single Again", "The Generation Gap"), lung cancer.
Willie Fernie, 82, Scottish footballer, Alzheimer's disease.
Bud Grant, 79, American television executive, president of CBS (1980–1987).
Anne LaBastille, 75, American author and ecologist.
Bébé Manga, 60, Cameroonian singer, cardiac arrest.
Bob McCann, 47, American basketball player (Minnesota Timberwolves, Washington Bullets), heart failure.
Harold Nelson, 88, New Zealand Olympic runner.
Paul Romand, 80, French Olympic skier.
Jean-Louis Rosier, 86, French racecar driver.

2
Ibrahim Abu-Rabiʽ, 54–55, Palestinian professor.
Khalid Aziz, 73, Pakistani cricket umpire.
Reeve Maclaren Bailey, 100, American ichthyologist.
Itamar Franco, 81, Brazilian politician, President (1992–1995), leukemia.
Magnar G. Huseby, 82, Norwegian engineer and politician.
Olivera Marković, 86, Serbian actress.
Ross Martin, 68, Australian Olympic cross-country skier, cycling accident.
Chaturanan Mishra, 86, Indian politician and trade union leader, after long illness.
Sir Oliver Napier, 75, Northern Irish politician, leader of the Alliance Party of Northern Ireland (1972–1984).
Robert Sklar, 75, American film historian, cycling accident.
Juno Stover-Irwin, 82, American diver, Olympic silver (1956) and bronze (1952) medalist.

3
Abdurehim Haji Amin, 68, Chinese politician.
Ali Bahar, 50, Bahraini singer, guitarist and organ player, kidney failure.
Iain Blair, 69, British romance novelist, published under the name Emma Blair.
Martin Crowe, 88, Australian Olympic athlete.
Francis King, 88, British writer.
Anna Massey, 73, British actress (Frenzy, Hotel du Lac), cancer.
Fred Newman, 76, American psychotherapist.
Sir Roy Redgrave, 85, British Army general.
Len Sassaman, 31, American cryptographer, suicide.
John C. Truesdale, 89, American public servant, National Labor Relations Board chairman (1998–2000), cancer.

4
Şerban Cantacuzino, 70, Romanian actor and nobleman, descendant of Wallachian Prince Şerban Cantacuzino.
Wes Covington, 79, American baseball player (Milwaukee Braves, Kansas City Athletics, Philadelphia Phillies), cancer.
John Davies Evans, 86, British archaeologist.
Rusty Farley, 57, American politician, member of the Oklahoma House of Representatives (2011).
*Otto von Habsburg, 98, Austro-Hungarian royal and politician, MEP (1979–1999).
Billy Hardee, 56, American football player (Denver Broncos, Ottawa Rough Riders), motorcycle accident.
Zurab Kapianidze, 74, Georgian actor and politician, MP (1999–2003).
Scott McLaren, 20, British Army soldier who was killed by the Taliban in Afghanistan.
Pablo McNeil, 71, Jamaican Olympic athlete and coach, after long illness.
Lawrence R. Newman, 86, American advocate for the deaf.
Éva Sebők-Szalay, 62, Hungarian Olympic volleyball player.
Jane Scott, 92, American rock music critic.
William G. Thrash, 94, American Marine Corps lieutenant general.
Neil Turner, 77, Australian politician, Speaker of the Legislative Assembly of Queensland (1996–1998); MLA for Warrego (1974–1986) and Nicklin (1990–1998).
Gerhard Unger, 95, German opera singer.

5
Hilda Anderson Nevárez, 72, Mexican trade union leader and politician.
Jaap Blokker, 69, Dutch businessman, cancer.
Neil Dougherty, 50, American basketball coach (TCU).
Malcolm Forsyth, 74, South African-born Canadian trombonist and composer, pancreatic cancer.
David Getches, 68, American educator and Native American rights lawyer, pancreatic cancer.
Armen Gilliam, 47, American basketball player (Phoenix Suns, New Jersey Nets, Milwaukee Bucks), heart attack.
George Lang, 86, Hungarian-born American restaurateur and cookbook author, Alzheimer's disease.
Odd Mæhlum, 89, Norwegian Olympic track and field athlete.
Fonce Mizell, 68, American jazz and R&B record producer (Mizell Brothers).
Mika Myllylä, 41, Finnish cross country skier, 1998 Olympic gold medalist. (body found on this date)
Theodore Roszak, 77, American scholar (The Making of a Counter Culture), cancer.
Hanna Segal, 92, British psychoanalyst.
John Sweet, 95, American actor (A Canterbury Tale).
Gordon Tootoosis, 69, Canadian actor (Pocahontas, Legends of the Fall) and activist, pneumonia.
Cy Twombly, 83, American painter, cancer.
Shinji Wada, 61, Japanese manga artist (Sukeban Deka), heart disease.

6
Steve Cardiff, 53, Canadian politician, automobile accident.
Paul-André Crépeau, 85, Canadian legal academic.
Daniel Mortimer Friedman, 95, American jurist.
Mani Kaul, 66, Indian filmmaker, after long illness.
George Edward Kimball, 67, American boxing columnist (Boston Herald), esophageal cancer.
Marketa Kimbrell, 82, American actress, Alzheimer's disease.
Warren Leslie, 84, American author, journalist and business executive.
John Mackey, 69, American Hall of Fame football player (Baltimore Colts, San Diego Chargers).
Josef Suk, 81, Czech violinist, prostate cancer.
Andreas Waldherr, 43, Austrian rally driver, workshop accident.
Mark Whitehead, 50, American Olympic cyclist.
Keith Wilson, 69, British production designer (Space: 1999).
Gabriele Zeilinger, 93, Austrian Olympic fencer.

7
Ricardo Alegría, 90, Puerto Rican anthropologist, complications of heart disease.
Peter Aucoin, 67, Canadian educator (Dalhousie University).
Bill Boddy, 98, British motor sport journalist.
Ganapathi Bose, 72, Indian cricketer.
Frank Brenchley, 93, British diplomat.
Allan W. Eckert, 80, American historian.
Manuel Galbán, 80, Cuban guitarist (Buena Vista Social Club), heart attack.
Rasika Joshi, 39, Indian actress, leukemia.
Yuri Kukin, 78, Russian singer-songwriter.
Humberto Leal Garcia, 38, Mexican murderer, executed by lethal injection.
José Carlos Martínez, 48, Argentine politician, Senator (since 2007), car crash.
Rizalino Navarro, 72, Filipino business executive, Secretary of Trade and Industry (1992–1996), heart attack.
Miguel Gatan Purugganan, 79, Filipino Roman Catholic prelate, Bishop of Ilagan (1974–1999).
Olav Versto, 60, Norwegian journalist and editor (Verdens Gang), apparent drowning.
Dick Williams, 82, American baseball player and manager (Oakland Athletics), Hall of Famer, ruptured aortic aneurysm.

8
Anthony Aikman, 69, British screenwriter and film director.
Kenny Baker, 85, American fiddler, complications from a stroke.
Roberts Blossom, 87, American actor (Home Alone, Escape from Alcatraz, Doc Hollywood), cerebrovascular disease.
William R. Corliss, 84, American physicist and writer.
Sam Denoff, 83, American Emmy Award-winning television writer (The Dick Van Dyke Show, That Girl), Alzheimer's disease.
Aleksis Dreimanis, 96, Latvian-born Canadian geologist.
Pete Duranko, 67, American football player (Denver Broncos), amyotrophic lateral sclerosis.
*Mary Fenech Adami, 77, Maltese First Lady (2004–2009), wife of Prime Minister Eddie Fenech Adami, heart attack.
Betty Ford, 93, American First Lady (1974–1977) and co-founder of Betty Ford Center.
Norman Hampson, 89, British historian.
Camille Lembi Zaneli, 61, Congolese Roman Catholic prelate, Bishop of Isangi (since 2000), plane crash.
George McAnthony, 45, Italian country singer, heart attack.
Paul Michael, 84, American actor, heart failure.
Adolfo Sánchez Vázquez, 95, Spanish-born Mexican philosopher, writer and educator.

9
Don Ackerman, 80, American basketball player (New York Knicks), after short illness.
Facundo Cabral, 74, Argentine singer and songwriter, shot.
Ralph Goldston, 82, American football player (Philadelphia Eagles, Hamilton Tiger-Cats).
Carl T. Langford, 92, American politician, Mayor of Orlando, Florida (1967–1980).
Peter Newmark, 95, British educator and scholar.
Percy Oliver, 92, Australian Olympic swimmer.
Arvo Salo, 79, Finnish writer and politician, MP (1966–1970, 1979–1983) and Minister of Culture (1982–1983).
Hideo Tanaka, 78, Japanese director (Sukeban Deka The Movie), stomach cancer.
Lee Vines, 92, Canadian-born American television announcer (What's My Line?) and actor, complications from a fall and pneumonia.
Würzel, 61, British guitarist (Motörhead), ventricular fibrillation.

10
Pierrette Alarie, 89, Canadian soprano, wife of tenor Léopold Simoneau.
Travis Bean, 63, American guitar maker, cancer.
Roberto Guerrero, 86–87, Argentine Olympic cyclist.
Ajit Das Gupta, 86, Indian cricketer.
Ragnar Lundberg, 86, Swedish athlete.
Frank Mascara, 81, American politician, U.S. Representative from Pennsylvania (1995–2003), lung cancer.
Roland Petit, 87, French ballet dancer and choreographer, leukemia.
Kelly Thomas, 37, American homeless man, beaten.
Deacon Turner, 56, American football player (Cincinnati Bengals), shot.
Malcolm Wild, 79, Australian soccer player.

11
Gary Bannerman, 64, Canadian journalist, liver complications.
Andy Barker, 87, American philanthropist.
F. C. Barnes, 82, American gospel musician.
Henry Carlisle, 84, American translator, novelist and anti-censorship activist.
Helen Crummy, 91, British social activist.
Michael Evans, 59, British Roman Catholic prelate, Bishop of East Anglia (since 2003), prostate cancer.
Tom Gehrels, 86, Dutch-born American astronomer.
Rob Grill, 67, American singer and songwriter (The Grass Roots).
Alex Hay, 78, British golf journalist.
Andreas Ioannides, 53, Cypriot navy chief, explosion.
Jaroslav Jiřík, 71, Czech hockey player (St. Louis Blues), plane crash.
George Lascelles, 7th Earl of Harewood, 88, British aristocrat, magazine editor and arts administrator, first cousin of Queen Elizabeth II.
Herbert Matayoshi, 82, American politician, Mayor of Hawaii County (1974–1984).
Richard F. Pedersen, 86, American diplomat, President of American University of Cairo (1977–1990).
Maxhob'ayakhawuleza Sandile, 55, South African monarch, King of Rharhabe.
Sir Filoimea Telito, 66, Tuvaluan President of the Church of Tuvalu, Governor-General (2005–2010), heart attack.
Steve Trimble, 53, American football player (Denver Broncos), heart attack.

12
Aftab Ahmad Khan, 87, Pakistani military officer, heart attack.
Premangsu Chatterjee, 83, Indian cricketer.
Peter Crampton, 79, British politician, member of the European Parliament (1989–1999), suspected brain haemorrhage.
William Crozier, 81, Irish artist.
Bob Fraser, 65–66, American actor, producer and writer, melanoma.
Bolesław Gładych, 93, Polish World War II flying ace.
Howard Hilton, 47, American baseball player (St. Louis Cardinals).
Ahmed Wali Karzai, 50, Afghan politician, brother of President Hamid Karzai, shot.
Jokapeci Koroi, 79, Fijian politician, President of Fiji Labour Party (1991–2011).
Francisco Villagrán Kramer, 84, Guatemalan politician, Vice President (1978–1980).
Kurt Lundquist, 85, Swedish Olympic bronze medal-winning (1948) athlete.
Charles Asa Schleck, 86, American Roman Catholic prelate, titular archbishop and under-secretary of the Congregation for the Evangelization of Peoples (1995–2000).
Rudy Schulze, 82, Canadian Olympic shooter.
Sherwood Schwartz, 94, American television producer and writer (The Brady Bunch, Gilligan's Island, I Married Joan).
Tony Stevens, 63, American choreographer, dancer and actor, Hodgkin's lymphoma.
Zdeněk Sýkora, 91, Czech abstract painter.

13
Raymond Beckman, 86, American Olympic soccer player, coronary artery disease.
Giacomo Benevelli, 86, Italian sculptor.
Per-Erik Burud, 48, Norwegian businessman, boating accident.
Al Debbo, 87, South African comedian.
Allan Jeans, 77, Australian football player and coach, pulmonary fibrosis.
John Mosca, 86, American restaurateur (Mosca's), prostate cancer.
Jerry Ragovoy, 80, American songwriter ("Time Is on My Side"), stroke.
Heinz Reincke, 86, German actor.
Niall Shanks, 52, British-born North American philosopher.

14
Dekha Ibrahim Abdi, 47, Kenyan peace activist, recipient of the Right Livelihood Award, car accident.
S. George Bankoff, 89, American chemical engineer.
Sissel Solbjørg Bjugn, 63, Norwegian poet and children's writer.
Isabel McNeill Carley, 92, American music educator and composer.
Eric Delaney, 87, British percussionist and band leader.
William Lockhart Garwood, 79, American jurist (United States Court of Appeals for the Fifth Circuit), heart attack.
Noel Gayler, 96, American Navy admiral.
Otia Ioseliani, 81, Georgian writer and dramatist.
Leo Kirch, 84, German media entrepreneur.
Vladimir Kosinsky, 66, Russian swimmer, 1968 Olympic silver and bronze medalist.
Terrence Lanni, 68, American casino executive, cancer.
Kennedy Ondiek, 44, Kenyan Olympic athlete.
Antonio Prieto, 85, Chilean singer and actor, cardiac arrest.

15
Helen Beverley, 94, American actress (Green Fields), natural causes.
Luis Enrique Sam Colop, 56, Guatemalan linguist.
Manuel Corral, 76, Spanish religious leader, Pope of the Palmarian Catholic Church (since 2005).
John Crook, 80, British ethologist.
Cuddly Dudley, 87, British rock and roll singer, natural causes.
Ed Flesh, 79, American art director, inventor of the Wheel of Fortune wheel, chronic obstructive pulmonary disease.
Cornell MacNeil, 88, American operatic baritone. 
Michael Magee, 81, Canadian actor (The Raccoons, Yes You Can), and author, colitis.
John S. Toll, 87, American physicist and educational administrator, heart failure.
Googie Withers, 94, English actress.

16
Milo Anstadt, 91, Dutch journalist and writer.
Bertalan Bicskei, 66, Hungarian footballer and coach.
Forrest Blue, 65, American football player (San Francisco 49ers, Baltimore Colts).
Geraint Bowen, 95, Welsh poet.
Rouhollah Dadashi, 30, Iranian powerlifter and bodybuilder, stabbed.
Albin Małysiak, 94, Polish Roman Catholic prelate, auxiliary bishop of Kraków (1970–1993).
Dame Katerina Mataira, 79, New Zealand educator and Māori language proponent, co-founder of Kura Kaupapa Māori.
Cesare Mazzolari, 74, Italian-born South Sudanese Roman Catholic prelate, Bishop of Rumbek (since 1998).
Joe McNamee, 84, American basketball player (Rochester Royals, Baltimore Bullets).
Kazimierz Neumann, 77, Polish Olympic rower.
Keith Smith, 96, Australian engineer.
Charlie Woollett, 90, English footballer (Bradford City).

17
Juan Arza, 88, Spanish footballer and coach.
Dionysios Bairaktaris, 84, Greek Orthodox hierarch, Metropolitan of Chios, Psara and Inousses (since 1979).
Juan María Bordaberry, 83, Uruguayan politician and dictator, President (1972–1976), after a long illness.
Georges Condominas, 90, French anthropologist.
Aba Dunner, 73, German-born Jewish religious activist.
Anne Garber, 64, Canadian journalist and writer, cancer.
Lo' Lo' Mohd Ghazali, 53, Malaysian politician, cancer.
Jan Mohammad Khan, Afghan presidential adviser, shot.
Jim Kincaid, 76, American news correspondent (ABC News), anchorman (WVEC) and essayist, heart attack.
John Kraaijkamp, Sr., 86, Dutch actor and comedian.
Takaji Mori, 67, Japanese Olympic bronze medal-winning (1968) footballer, renal pelvic cancer.
Joe Morris, Sr., 85, American Navajo World War II code talker.
David Ngoombujarra, 44, Australian actor (Kangaroo Jack, Australia, Ned Kelly).
Graciela Rivera, 90, Puerto Rican opera singer.
Ştefan Sameş, 59, Romanian footballer (Steaua București), cancer.
Alex Steinweiss, 94, American graphic designer, inventor of the album cover.
Taiji, 45, Japanese musician and singer-songwriter (X Japan), suicide by hanging.
Mohammed Hashim Watanwal, 58–59, Afghan politician, shot.
Joe Lee Wilson, 75, American jazz singer.

18
Nat Allbright, 87, American radio broadcaster, pneumonia.
Mohammad Taghi Barkhordar, 87, Iranian industrialist and entrepreneur.
Salvador Bernárdez, 58, Honduran footballer, heart attack.
Albert Driedger, 75, Canadian politician, stroke.
Sean Hoare, 47, British journalist (News of the World), whistleblower of the 2011 phone hacking scandal, natural causes. (body found on this date)
E. A. J. Honigmann, 83, British Shakespearean scholar.
Magnus Malan, 81, South African politician, Minister of Defence (1980–1991), natural causes.
Giulio Rinaldi, 76, Italian Olympic boxer.
Bob Stenehjem, 59, American politician, member of the North Dakota Senate (since 1993), majority leader (since 2001), car accident.
Edson Stroll, 82, American actor (McHale's Navy), cancer.
James Wong Kim Min, 89, Malaysian politician, first Deputy Chief Minister of Sarawak, leader of the national Opposition (1974), heart attack.
Bagley Wright, 87, American developer and philanthropist.

19
Sheila Burrell, 89, British actress.
William Leonard D'Mello, 80, Indian Roman Catholic prelate, Bishop of Karwar (1976–2007).
Remo Gaspari, 90, Italian politician.
Lil Greenwood, 86, American vocalist (Duke Ellington Orchestra).
Yoshio Harada, 71, Japanese actor, pneumonia.
Henrique Johannpötter, 78, German-born Brazilian Roman Catholic prelate, Bishop of Bacabal (1989–1997).
*Pierre Jonquères d'Oriola, 91, French equestrian, Olympic gold (1952, 1964) and silver (1964, 1968) medalist.
Jacques Jouanneau, 84, French actor.
Brendan Kehoe, 40, Irish software developer and author, acute myeloid leukemia.
Karen Khachaturian, 90, Russian composer.
Roy Meehan, 79, New Zealand Olympic wrestler.
James T. Molloy, 75, American government officer, last Doorkeeper of the House of Representatives (1974–1993), complications of diabetes.
Sir Julian Oswald, 77, British admiral.
Cec Thompson, 85, British rugby league player.

20
Sudarshan Akarapu, 57, Indian politician, heart attack.
Armando Martín Borque, 90, Spanish entrepreneur.
Blaize Clement, 78, American mystery writer and psychologist, cancer.
Lucian Freud, 88, German-born British painter.
Isaia Italeli, 51, Tuvaluan Cabinet minister. (body found on this date)
Myra Kraft, 68, American philanthropist, wife of New England Patriots owner Robert Kraft, cancer.
Jim Samios, 77, Australian politician, member of the New South Wales Legislative Council (1984–2003).
Gloria Sawai, 78, American-born Canadian author.
Mary Simpson, 85, American minister, first woman to be ordained by the American Episcopal Church.
Mark Anthony Stroman, 41, American convicted spree killer, executed by lethal injection.
Whetu Tirikatene-Sullivan, 79, New Zealand politician, longest-serving female member of the House of Representatives (1967–1996).

21
Franz Alt, 100, Austrian-born American mathematician.
Clément Cailleau, 88, French-born Senegalese Roman Catholic prelate, Prefect of Tambacounda (1970–1986).
Ashleigh Connor, 21, Australian soccer player, car accident.
Andrew Grant DeYoung, 37, American convicted murderer, executed by lethal injection.
Pedro Claro Meurice Estiu, 79, Cuban Roman Catholic prelate, Archbishop of Santiago de Cuba (1970–2007).
Elliot Handler, 95, American businessman, co-founder of Mattel, namer of the Barbie doll, creator of Hot Wheels, heart failure.
William Hildenbrand, 89, American government officer, Secretary of the United States Senate (1981–1985).
Yevgeny Lopatin, 93, Russian Olympic silver medal-winning (1952) weightlifter.
Santokh Singh Matharu, 69, Kenyan Olympic hockey player.
Slavomir Miklovš, 77, Croatian Greek Catholic hierarch, Bishop of Križevci (1983–2009).
Bruce Sundlun, 91, American politician, Governor of Rhode Island (1991–1995).
Kazimierz Świątek, 96, Estonian-born Belarusian Roman Catholic cardinal, Archbishop of Minsk-Mohilev (1991–2006).
Jack Thompson, 82, British politician, MP for Wansbeck (1983–1997).
Len Tolhurst, 85, Australian Olympic shooter.
Amelia Trice, 75, American Kootenai tribal leader and activist, leader of the last Indian war against the United States, cancer.
Wang Daheng, 96, Chinese optical physicist.
Elwy Yost, 86, Canadian television host and writer.

22
Alex Adams, 76, American basketball coach.
Tom Aldredge, 83, American actor (The Sopranos, Boardwalk Empire), lymphoma.
Linda Christian, 87, Mexican-born American actress, first Bond girl (1954 television adaptation of Casino Royale), colon cancer.
Dmitri Furman, 68, Russian historian and philosopher, after long illness.
Volodymyr O. Kravets, 81, Ukrainian diplomat, permanent Representative of Ukraine to the United Nations, Minister of Foreign Affairs of the Ukrainian SSR.
Charles Manatt, 75, American lawyer and banker, Chair of Democratic National Committee (1981–1985), Ambassador to Dominican Republic (1999–2001), stroke.
Malcolm Muir, 96, American jurist.
Ifti Nasim, 64, Pakistani-born American poet and radio host, heart attack.
Tex Nelson, 74, American baseball player (Baltimore Orioles).
Wolfram Thiem, 55, German Olympic rower.
Cees de Wolf, 65, Dutch footballer (Ajax Amsterdam).

23
David Aiken, 93, American operatic baritone and opera director.
Toyoo Ashida, 67, Japanese animator and film director (Fist of the North Star). 
Mathilde Aussant, 113, French supercentenarian, France's oldest woman.
Blair, 43, American poet.
Terence Boston, Baron Boston of Faversham, 81, British politician, MP for Faversham (1964–1970).
John Chervokas, 74, American advertising writer.
Robert Ettinger, 92, American cryonicist, respiratory failure.
Jack Fitzpatrick, 88, American entrepreneur and politician, co-founder of Country Curtains, Massachusetts State Senator (1973–1980).
Milton Gwirtzman, 78, American speech writer, advisor to the Kennedy family, metastatic melanoma.
Fran Landesman, 83, American lyricist and poet.
Butch Lewis, 65, American boxing promoter, heart attack.
Christopher Mayer, 57, American actor (The Dukes of Hazzard, Santa Barbara, Liar Liar).
Conrad Meyer, 89, British Anglican prelate, Bishop of Dorchester (1979–1988)
Bill Morrissey, 59, American singer-songwriter.
*Nguyễn Cao Kỳ, 80, Vietnamese air force chief and political leader, Prime Minister of South Vietnam (1965–1967).
Richard Pike, 61, British chemist.
Darioush Rezaeinejad, 35, Iranian nuclear scientist, shot.
John Shalikashvili, 75, Polish-born American army general, Chairman of the Joint Chiefs of Staff (1993–1997), stroke.
Elmer B. Staats, 97, American public servant, Comptroller General of the United States (1966–1981).
Amy Winehouse, 27, British singer-songwriter ("Rehab", "Stronger Than Me", "Take the Box"), accidental alcohol poisoning.

24
Ron Davies, 85, Australian politician, Western Australian Opposition Leader (1978–1981).
Kaveinga Faʻanunu, 48, Tongan politician, MP for Tongatapu 9 (since 2010), head and neck cancer.
Tresa Hughes, 81, American actress (Another World, Don Juan DeMarco, Fame).
Gilbert Luján, 70, American painter, prostate cancer.
Hideki Irabu, 42, Japanese baseball player (Chiba Lotte Marines, New York Yankees, Montreal Expos), suicide by hanging.
Paul Marchand, 74, Canadian Roman Catholic prelate, Bishop of Timmins (since 1999).
Henry Metelmann, 88, German soldier and writer.
Virgilio Noè, 89, Italian Roman Catholic cardinal, Archpriest of the Basilica of Saint Peter (1991–2002).
Mike Palm, 86, American baseball player (Boston Red Sox).
Dan Peek, 60, American singer-songwriter (America), fibrinous pericarditis.
David Servan-Schreiber, 50, French physician, neuroscientist and author, cancer.
G. D. Spradlin, 90, American actor (North Dallas Forty, The Godfather Part II, Apocalypse Now).
Skip Thomas, 61, American football player (Oakland Raiders), apparent heart attack.
John Turner, 63, British social psychologist.
Jane White, 88, American actress (Beloved, Klute, Once Upon a Mattress).
Hans-Werner Wohlers, 77, German Olympic boxer.

25
Norman Aspin, 88, British diplomat.
Michael Cacoyannis, 89, Cypriot filmmaker (Zorba the Greek).
Bakır Çağlar, 69–70, Turkish jurist, lawyer and constitutional law professor, bleeding stomach.
V. S. Krishna Iyer, 89, Indian activist and politician, after long illness.
Mahmoud Mabsout, 69, Lebanese actor, heart attack.
Denis Meaney, 74, Australian rugby league player.
Arthur W. Murray, 92, American test pilot, Alzheimer's disease.
Jeret Peterson, 29, American free style skier, 2010 Winter Olympics silver medalist, suicide by gunshot.
Ravichandran, 71, Malaysian-born Indian actor, lung infection.
David Somerville, 95, Canadian Anglican prelate.

26
Jay Adcox, 60, American football player and coach, cancer.
Joe Arroyo, 55, Colombian singer.
Jacques Fatton, 85, French-born Swiss footballer.
Frank Foster, 82, American jazz saxophonist and composer, complications from kidney failure.
Bobby Franklin, 54, American politician, member of the Georgia House of Representatives (since 1997), apparent heart attack.
Ahmed al-Gaddafi al-Qahsi, Libyan Army colonel, cousin and son-in-law of Muammar Gaddafi, air strike.
Richard Harris, 63, American football player (Philadelphia Eagles, Seattle Seahawks) and coach (Winnipeg Blue Bombers), heart attack.
Madhu Sudan Kanungo, 84, Indian scientist.
Sakyo Komatsu, 80, Japanese science fiction writer, pneumonia.
Georges Kwaïter, 83, Syrian-born Lebanese Melkite Catholic hierarch, Archbishop of Saïdā (1987–2006).
Elmer Lower, 98, American broadcast executive, president of ABC News (1963–1974).
Silvio Narizzano, 84, Canadian-born British film and television director.
Margaret Olley, 88, Australian painter.
John Read, 88, British documentary producer.
Josephine C. Reyes, 82, Filipino educator, President of Far Eastern University (1985–1989).
Denise Scharley, 94, French contralto.
Howard Stein, 84, American financier, complications of a stroke.
Luis Ruiz Suarez, 97, Spanish-born Macanese Jesuit priest.

27
Wilfred Arsenault, 57, Canadian politician, cancer.
Rudolf Baláž, 70, Slovak Roman Catholic prelate, Bishop of Banská Bystrica (since 1990).
Bejaratana, 85, Thai royal, only daughter of King Vajiravudh of Thailand.
Richard Chavez, 81, American activist and labor organizer, brother of Cesar Chavez, complications from surgery.
Clyde Duncan, 57, Guyanese West Indian cricket umpire, cancer.
Hilary Evans, 82, British picture librarian and author.
Charles Gittens, 82, American Secret Service agent, first black appointed to that position.
Ghulam Haider Hamidi, 65, Afghan politician, Mayor of Kandahar (since 2007), bombing.
Rei Harakami, 40, Japanese musician, cerebrovascular disease.
Agota Kristof, 75, Hungarian-born French novelist.
Jerome Liebling, 87, American photographer, filmmaker and academic (Hampshire College).
Polly Platt, 72, American film producer (Say Anything...), amyotrophic lateral sclerosis.
Sir John Rawlins, 89, British naval officer, pioneer of diving medicine.
Eduard Rozovsky, 84, Russian cinematographer (Amphibian Man, White Sun of the Desert), car accident.
Richard Rutt, 85, British Anglican prelate, Bishop of Leicester (1979–1991)
Pietro Sambi, 73, Italian Roman Catholic prelate, titular archbishop and Apostolic Nuncio to the United States (since 2005), respiratory failure.
Judy Sowinski, 71, American roller derby skater and coach.
Francis John Spence, 85, Canadian Roman Catholic prelate, Archbishop of Kingston (1982–2002).
John Stott, 90, British Anglican priest.

28
Lev Baklyshkin, 77, Soviet Olympic equestrian.
Frank Bender, 70, American forensic artist, pleural mesothelioma.
Miguel Chacón Díaz, 81, Spanish cyclist.
James E. Dyer, 64, American politician, Mayor of Danbury, Connecticut (1979–1987).
Ahmed Omaid Khpalwak, 25, Afghan journalist (BBC News), explosion.
Agapito Lozada, 72, Filipino Olympic swimmer.
John Marburger, 70, American physicist and presidential adviser, non-Hodgkin lymphoma.
Brian O'Leary, 71, American scientist and NASA astronaut, cancer.
Christopher Walkden, 73, British Olympic swimmer.
John Milton Yinger, 95, American sociologist.
Abdul Fatah Younis, 67, Libyan rebel leader and government official, former Interior Minister, shot.

29
Elazar Abuhatzeira, 62, Moroccan-born Israeli rabbi, stabbed.
John Edward Anderson, 93, American businessman and philanthropist, pneumonia.
Jack Barlow, 87, American country music singer and songwriter.
Arild Braastad, 64, Norwegian diplomat.
Joseph V. Brady, 89, American behavioral neuroscientist.
Enzo Coppini, 91, Italian cyclist.
Claude Laydu, 84, Belgian actor, heart condition.
Richard Marsh, Baron Marsh, 83, British politician and businessman, MP for Greenwich (1959–1971), Chairman of British Rail (1971–1976).
Nella Martinetti, 65, Swiss singer-songwriter, pancreatic cancer.
Gene McDaniels, 76, American singer-songwriter.
Ivan Milas, 72, Croatian politician.
Takeshi Miyaji, 45, Japanese video game designer and business executive (GunGriffon, Grandia).
Matthew J. Perry, 89, American federal judge.
Emeric Santo, 90, Australian Olympic fencer.
Agnes Varis, 81, American philanthropist, cancer.
Derek Woodhead, 76, Australian cricketer.

30
*Hikmat Abu Zayd, 88, Egyptian politician, first female cabinet minister.
James Atkinson, 97, English priest, biblical scholar, and theologian.
R.E.G. Davies, 90, British aviation historian.
Pêr Denez, 90, French Breton linguist and writer.
Clifton Hurburgh, 94, Australian cricketer.
Mario Echandi Jiménez, 96, Costa Rican politician, President (1958–1962), pneumonia.
Vincent Kympat, 64, Indian Roman Catholic prelate, first Bishop of Jowai (since 2006).
Daniel D. McCracken, 81, American computer scientist, cancer.
Sam Norkin, 94, American caricaturist and illustrator.
Bob Peterson, 79, American basketball player (New York Knicks, Baltimore Bullets, Milwaukee Hawks), cancer.

31
David R. Adamson, 88, Canadian Air Force officer.
Eliseo Alberto, 59, Cuban-born Mexican writer, complications from a kidney transplant.
Dorothy Brunson, 72, American businesswoman, first black woman to own a radio station, ovarian cancer.
Willie Corbett, 88, Scottish footballer (Celtic).
Clyde Holding, 80, Australian politician, federal minister (1984–1990).
John Hoyland, 76, English abstract painter, complications following heart surgery.
Louis, 59, Serbian singer, car accident.
Andrea Pazzagli, 51, Italian footballer (A.C. Milan), stroke.
Joseph Albert Rosario, 96, Indian Roman Catholic prelate, Bishop of Amravati (1955–1995).
Carl Steven, 36, American actor (Star Trek III: The Search for Spock, Honey, I Shrunk the Kids, A Pup Named Scooby-Doo), heroin overdose.
Binka Zhelyazkova, 88, Bulgarian director.

References

2011-07
 07